Comethazine the Album is the second studio album by American rapper Comethazine, released on October 22, 2021, by Alamo Records.

Track listing

Charts

References

2021 albums
Comethazine albums